Gabriella Dorio (born 27 June 1957 in Veggiano, Veneto) is an Italian former athlete and Olympic gold winner. She won two medals, at senior level, at the International athletics competitions.

Biography
She first participated in the 1976 Summer Olympics, placing sixth in the 1500 metres race then ran the same event and placed fifth in Summer Olympics 4 years later. She won the gold medal at the 1982 European Indoor Championships, the bronze medal at the 1982 European Championships, and finally the gold medal at the 1984 Summer Olympics in Los Angeles, beating the Romanians Doina Melinte (silver) and Maricica Puică (bronze).

She has 65 caps in national team from 1973 to 1991.

Achievements

National titles
Gabriella Dorio has won 23 times the individual national championship.
7 wins in the 800 metres (1974, 1975, 1976, 1980, 1981, 1982, 1983)
10 wins in the 1500 metres (1973, 1976, 1977, 1978, 1979, 1980, 1981, 1982, 1983, 1984)
2 wins in the 800 metres indoor (1978, 1979)
2 wins in the 1500 metres indoor (1981, 1983)
2 wins in the cross country running (1976, 1983)

See also
 Italian Athletics Championships - Women multi winners
 Italy national athletics team - Women's more caps
 Italian all-time top lists - 800 m
 Italian all-time top lists - 1500 m
 FIDAL Hall of Fame

References

External links
 

1957 births
Living people
Sportspeople from the Province of Padua
Italian female middle-distance runners
Athletes (track and field) at the 1976 Summer Olympics
Athletes (track and field) at the 1980 Summer Olympics
Athletes (track and field) at the 1984 Summer Olympics
Olympic athletes of Italy
Olympic gold medalists for Italy
World Athletics Championships athletes for Italy
European Athletics Championships medalists
Medalists at the 1984 Summer Olympics
Olympic gold medalists in athletics (track and field)
Universiade medalists in athletics (track and field)
Mediterranean Games gold medalists for Italy
Mediterranean Games medalists in athletics
Athletes (track and field) at the 1979 Mediterranean Games
Universiade gold medalists for Italy
Medalists at the 1981 Summer Universiade
Medalists at the 1983 Summer Universiade
Italian Athletics Championships winners